Thomas Joshua Stratford Dugdale  (born 20 September 1974) is a British farmer, estate owner and documentary film-maker.

Education and personal life
He attended Eton College, studied economics at the University of Manchester, and law at City, University of London. He has two children, Lily and Salvador, with author Sasha Norris, and two further children, Ferdinand and Francis, with Diana Redvers, who he married in 2009. In 2016 he signed an open letter to the Times against Brexit on behalf of British business leaders, and in 2018 he became patron of the West Berkshire Mencap.

Career

Documentary film
His 2002 film for the BBC, LAPD Blues, won the highest ratings of that year for a BBC current affairs documentary.

In 2005–2008 he made a three-year biopic of the fourteenth Dalai Lama Tenzin Gyatso, The Unwinking Gaze. In this film he recorded the Dalai Lama as a leader of the Tibetan people, rather than portraying him as spiritual leader in Tibetan Buddhism as is done customarily. The documentary was awarded Mammoth Best Documentary in 2008 as well as the runner up in the Best Documentary section for the Foreign Press Association in 2008. The Guardian suggested that it could force China into a more civil and humanitarian stance towards Tibet.

Wasing estate
Dugdale took over management of the Wasing estate in Berkshire (which includes Wasing Place and Wasing Park) from his grandparents in 2008. Its manor is centred on a manor house which was purchased in 1759 by the London nautical publisher John Mount, a maternal ancestor of Dugdale's. Mount built the mansion Wasing Place, completed in 1770, which became the home of his descendants the MPs, William Mount, William George Mount and Sir William Mount. The house was rebuilt after a fire in 1945.

Under Dugdale Wasing Park hosted Glade Festival after its transfer from a stage at Glastonbury Festival.

In 2015 he concluded a £3 million restoration project, and opened the estate up to alternative events. Later that year, sixty pheasants were killed with catapults and beheaded on the estate.

In 2016 the annual Mizuno Endure 24 race held on the estate was disrupted when hundreds of runners reported a "mystery illness" which they had contracted on site.

In 2018 Dugdale submitted plans to build further visitor facilities and a farm shop at the Wasing estate, claiming 30 jobs would be created.

On the death of Dugdale's mother, Lady Cecilia Dugdale, in 2019 Dugdale inherited the estate in full after many years of managing and farming it. He is the 7th generation of his maternal family (the Mount baronets) to do so.

In 2020 Dugdale co-founded the Medicine Festival on the estate.

Family
Dugdale is the son of former Aston Villa chairman Sir William Dugdale, 2nd Baronet of Blyth Hall, a descendant of the Noble House of Stratford, and his wife, Cecilia (Cylla) Mary, daughter of Sir William Mount, 2nd Baronet of Wasing Place in Berkshire. Dugdale is also a cousin of former Conservative Party leader and Prime Minister of the United Kingdom, David Cameron.

Filmography

References

Stratford family
1974 births
Living people
Alumni of the University of Manchester
British documentary filmmakers
People from Wasing
Younger sons of baronets